A club fighter (or clubfighter) is a professional boxer who usually fights locally and has a mediocre record. Club fighters generally are not nationally recognized and have not won any fights that show the ability to win a championship. The term is often used as a pejorative for over-hyped fighters or for older boxers when they begin to decline. For example, Floyd Mayweather Jr. called Arturo Gatti "a blown-up club fighter", even though Gatti was the WBC super lightweight champion at the time.

A club fighter is less respected than a contender, who defeats gatekeepers, journeymen and club fighters in order to establish themselves as a challenger for a world title. A journeyman is slightly more respected than a club fighter — often by way of having a superficially good record.

Boxing terminology
Pejorative terms for people